Gary Malcolm Thomas (born 31 October 1973) is an English cricketer.  Thomas is a right-handed batsman who bowled right-arm medium pace.  He was born at Penzance, Cornwall.

Thomas made his Minor Counties Championship debut for Cornwall in 1992 against Dorset.  From 1992 to present, he has represented the county in 108 Minor Counties Championship matches.  Thomas  also represents Cornwall in the MCCA Knockout Trophy.  His debut in that competition came against Dorset in 1994. From 1994 to present, he has represented the county in 46 Trophy matches.  From 1999 to 2001, he was the Cornwall captain.

Thomas has also represented Cornwall in List A cricket.  His debut List A match came against Middlesex in the 1995 NatWest Trophy.  From 1995 to 2003, he represented the county in 12 List A matches, the last of which came against the Netherlands in the 1st round of the 2004 Cheltenham & Gloucester Trophy which was played in 2003.  In his 12 List A matches, he scored 115 runs at a batting average of 9.58, with a high score of 44.  In the field he took 3 catches.

References

External links

Gary Thomas at Cricinfo
Gary Thomas at CricketArchive

1973 births
Living people
Sportspeople from Penzance
English cricketers
Cornwall cricketers
Cornwall cricket captains